Mikayla Pauga (born 10 April 2003) is an Australian rules footballer playing for the Brisbane Lions in the AFL Women's competition (AFLW). 

Pauga is from the Sunshine Coast, Queensland and played with the Maroochydore Football Club prior to moving to the Gold Coast and playing with Bond University in the QAFLW and awarded the Riewoldt Family AFL Excellence Scholarship as part of the Brisbane Lions Academy before being drafted by the Lions. Pauga made her AFLW debut against Richmond on 24 September 2022 at the Punt Road Oval.

References 

2003 births
Living people
Sportswomen from Queensland
Sportspeople from the Sunshine Coast
Australian rules footballers from Queensland
Brisbane Lions (AFLW) players